A coup d'état in Nepal began on 1 February, when democratically elected members of the country's ruling party, the Nepali Congress were deposed by Gyanendra, King of Nepal. The parliament was reinstated in 2006, when the king agreed to give up absolute power following the Loktantra Andolan. The coup was condemned by India, the United Kingdom, and the United States.

Background 
The Nepalese Government was previously ruled as an absolute monarchy following the 1960 Nepal coup d'état led by King Mahendra until it became a constitutional monarchy in 1991 during King Birendra's reign. King Gyanendra came into power after the Nepalese royal massacre where ten members of the royal family, including King Birendra, Queen Aishwarya, and Crown Prince Dipendra were killed. King had previously dismissed three governments from 2002. The Nepalese Civil War led by Maoists was still raging on with over 11,000 people dead. Nepal had no parliament from 2002. Gyanendra's popularity had fallen down.

Unfolding of the coup 
On 1 February when King Gyanendra declared a state of emergency and dissolved the parliament of Nepal. The members of parliament were put under house arrest, "key constitutional rights were suspended, soldiers enforced complete censorship, and communications were cut". 

The coup was condemned by India, the United Kingdom, and the United States. The king's rule lasted for over a year, until 24 April 2006, when the king agreed to give up absolute power and to reinstate the dissolved House of Representatives, following the Loktantra Andolan.

References

Further reading 

 

2005 in Nepal
Politics of the Nepalese Civil War
Coups in Nepal